Marsipiophora is a genus of moths of the family Erebidae. The genus was erected by Oscar John in 1909.

Species
Marsipiophora calopepla Varga & Ronkay, 1991
Marsipiophora christophi (Erschoff, 1874)

References

Calpinae